Sylter Geschichten is a German television series.

See also
List of German television series

External links
 

1993 German television series debuts
1995 German television series endings
Television shows set on islands
German-language television shows
RTL (German TV channel) original programming